Cavarus was a Celtic king in Thrace and the last king of Tylis. Under Cavarus, Tylis was destroyed by the Thracians in 212 BC.

References

Further reading

Gaulish rulers
Ancient Thrace
Celts